The Franchère Lake (French: Lac Franchère) is a fresh water body located in the head zone of the rivière aux Écorces du Milieu, in the unorganized territory of Lac-Jacques-Cartier, in the La Côte-de-Beaupré Regional County Municipality, in the administrative region of Capitale-Nationale, in Quebec, Canada. Lac Franchère is part of the Laurentides Wildlife Reserve.

The area around the lake is served by secondary forest roads for forestry and recreational tourism activities. Forestry is the main economic activity in the sector; recreational tourism, second.

The surface of Lac Franchère is usually frozen from the beginning of December to the end of March, however the safe circulation on the ice is generally done from mid-December to mid-March.

Geography 
The main watersheds near Lac Franchère are:
 north side: rivière aux Écorces North-East, Delphis stream;
 east side: Honorine River, Jacques-Cartier River;
 south side: rivière aux Écorces du Milieu, rivière aux Écorces;
 west side: rivière aux Écorces du Milieu, Kane stream.

This lake is mainly supplied by the outlet of Lac Ballon, as well as the outlet of Lakes Day and Germain. The mouth of Lac Franchère is located at:
  north-east of the confluence of the rivière aux Écorces du Milieu and the rivière aux Écorces;
  south-east of the mouth of the Pikauba River (confluence with the Kenogami Lake);
  north-west of Jacques-Cartier Lake.

From the mouth of Lac Franchère, the current follows the course of:
 the rivière aux Écorces du Milieu on  generally towards the southwest;
 the rivière aux Écorces on  generally towards the northeast;
 the Pikauba River on  generally towards the northeast;
 the Kenogami Lake on  towards the northeast to barrage de Portage-des-Roches;
 the Saguenay River on  eastward to Tadoussac where it merges with the Saint Lawrence estuary.

Toponymy 
The toponym Lac Franchère was formalized on December 5, 1968, by the Commission de toponymie du Québec.

References

Related articles 
 La Côte-de-Beaupré Regional County Municipality, a MRC
 Lac-Jacques-Cartier, a TNO
 Rivière aux Écorces du Milieu
 Rivière aux Écorces
 Pikauba River
 List of lakes of Canada

Lakes of Capitale-Nationale
La Côte-de-Beaupré Regional County Municipality
Laurentides Wildlife Reserve